Tupelče is a small village west of Štanjel in the Municipality of Komen in the Littoral region of Slovenia.

References

External links

Tupelče on Geopedia

Populated places in the Municipality of Komen